The Firing Squad is a 1999 drama film directed by Tim Story starring Kevin Mambo. It was Tim Story's second film as director.

Plot

A woman tries to obtain justice for a friend and instead finds she and her friends are in grave danger in this crime drama.

Cast
 Kevin Mambo as Kane
 Megahn Perry
 Brian Buccellato as Evan
 Damon Wilson as City
 Melanna Gray as Beauty
 Regina Williams

Production
Tim's wife Vicki Mara Story told Variety that "she and Tim borrowed several hundred thousand dollars, including a $40,000 line of credit from her father."

References

External links
 
 

American crime drama films
Films directed by Tim Story
1999 films
1999 crime drama films
Hood films
1990s English-language films
1990s American films